Étaimpuis is a commune in the Seine-Maritime department in the Normandy region in northern France.

Geography
The A29 autoroute crosses the southern part of the commune's territory.

History
The commune was formed in 1824 by the merger of the 3 former parishes of Biennais, Étaimpuis and Leuilly.

Population

Places of interest
 The church of St.Martin at Étaimpuis, dating from the nineteenth century.
 The church of St.Martin at Biennais, dating from the seventeenth century.

See also
Communes of the Seine-Maritime department

References

Communes of Seine-Maritime